LIM College is a private for-profit college in Midtown Manhattan focused on the business of fashion. LIM College offers master's, bachelor's, and associate degree programs in fashion-focused majors with an emphasis on the connection between real-world experience and academic study.

History
LIM College was founded in 1939 by retail and education expert Maxwell F. Marcuse as the Laboratory Institute of Merchandising, at the request of retailers who wanted a school that would teach women about the fashion business and merchandising. LIM became co-ed in 1971 and Maxwell's son, Adrian G. Marcuse, became president in 1972. During his tenure, LIM College became accredited by the Middle States Commission on Higher Education and earned authority from New York State to grant bachelor's degrees. Former fashion executive Elizabeth S. Marcuse assumed the presidency in 2002. In 2009, the school changed its name to LIM College.

Academics
LIM College offers undergraduate majors leading to a bachelor's degree in International Business, Fashion Media, Fashion Merchandising, Visual Studies, Marketing Management and The Business of Cannabis. Minors are available in several fields, including, but not limited to, Sustainability, English, Global Studies, Digital Design and Photography, Entrepreneurship, and Interior and Residential Concepts. Associate degree programs are also offered.

At the graduate level, LIM offers Master of Professional Studies (MPS) degree programs in Consumer Analytics, Fashion Merchandising & Retail Management, Fashion Marketing, the Business of Fashion, and Global Fashion Supply Chain Management. Several of LIM College's degree programs are also offered in a fully online format. Saturday and summer programs for high school students and a summer immersion program for international students are available as well.

Experiential education, or "learn by doing", is the foundation of LIM's educational approach. Undergraduate students must complete three internships, including one in a retail environment, one at the retail managerial level or in a corporate setting, and during senior year, students must complete a nearly full-time internship related to their specific career goals. Many students volunteer at events such as New York Fashion Week, and participate in industry-sponsored competitions, and fashion professionals regularly visit campus to share their insights with students.

Accreditation
LIM College is accredited by the Middle States Commission on Higher Education and its BBA, BPS, and associate degree programs are accredited by the Accreditation Council for Business Schools and Programs. Also, LIM College is cited as one of The Best Fashion Schools in the World 2019 in the BoF’s (The Business of Fashion) global assessment of fashion education. BoF is a leading digital authority on the global fashion industry.

Enrollment
In 2020, LIM College had a total undergraduate enrollment of 1,503, with a gender distribution of 11 percent male students and 89 percent female students. Approximately one quarter of the students live in college-owned, -operated or -affiliated housing. The on-campus undergraduate student-to-faculty ratio was 9 to 1 and the average undergraduate class size was 17. There were also 278 students enrolled in the LIM College's graduate programs (170 on-campus/108 online).

Campus
The campus consists of two buildings in Midtown Manhattan, located in walking distance of each other. Student housing is offered through Educational Housing Services at the New Yorker residence in Midtown West. In the 2021-2022 academic year, student housing was also offered at SVA's Ludlow residence on the Lower East Side of Manhattan. For the 2022-23 school year, housing is offered at FOUND Study's Midtown East location on Lexington Avenue.

 Fifth Avenue building, at 545 Fifth Avenue – 
 Maxwell Hall, at 216 East 45th Street – 
 FOUND Study Midtown East, at 569 Lexington Avenue

External recognition
In 2019, The Business of Fashion named LIM College as one of "The Best Fashion Schools in the World". LIM was named to Phi Theta Kappa's Transfer Honor Roll in 2016, 2017, 2018, 2019, 2020, and 2021. The Princeton Review included LIM College on its list of "Best Northeastern Colleges" for 2022.

Alumni
Notable LIM College alumni include:

 Zerina Akers, stylist for Beyonce
 Daniella Vitale, Chief Executive Officer, Salvatore Ferragamo NA
 Leanne Gomez, Group Vice President, Ross Stores
 Florina Adili, Regional Vice President, Ulta Beauty
 Ana Berroa, Vice President of Strategic Sourcing, Hasbro

References

External links 
 Official website

1939 establishments in New York (state)
Educational institutions established in 1939
Fashion merchandising
Fashion schools in the United States
Universities and colleges in Manhattan
Universities and colleges in New York City